"The Reeling" is a song by American electronic band Passion Pit. It was released on May 11, 2009, as the first single from the band's debut studio album, Manners. The song features background vocals from the PS22 Chorus. Generally well received by music critics, the single entered the Billboard Alternative Songs chart in September 2009. In the United Kingdom, the single originally peaked at number 137, but was re-issued in January 2010, where it performed slightly better at number 99. With this improved showing, the record company then re-issued "Sleepyhead" in March 2010. The song was featured on soccer video game Pro Evolution Soccer 2011.

A music video for the song premiered in April 2009. It depicts a carefree night on the town and uses ripped-paper visual effects. A remixed version of "The Reeling" was used on the trailer for the fourth season of the British TV series Skins.

Critical reception
Lou Thomas of the BBC praised the song's vocals and beats, and called it "unquestionably one of the greatest songs of 2009." 
Emily Kendrick of This Is Fake DIY noted the song's exuberance and compared it vocally to the Bee Gees. 
Louise Brailey of NME said the song's opening "sounds weirdly like an
old-school hardcore breakdown, before collapsing into starry disco-pop." 
Mike Diver of Clash magazine said the song "combine[s] elements of the purest pop with compositional playfulness." 
Matthew Cole of Slant Magazine credits the song's ability, along with album track "Moth's Wings," to combine decades worth of "party music" genres, including disco, house, rave, and 1980s rock.
Zach Kelly of Pitchfork Media described the song as sweet and earnest, adding that listeners "won't remember it the next morning, but it probably earned a grin the night before." 
Andrzej Lukowski of Drowned in Sound called the song "quite annoying," though he gave the album a favorable review overall.

Chart performance

Track listing

References

External links
 Official band website
 

2009 singles
Passion Pit songs
2009 songs
Columbia Records singles
Frenchkiss Records singles